Crosa is a frazione of the comune of Lessona, in the Province of Biella in the Italian region Piedmont, located about  northeast of Turin and about  northeast of Biella.
From 1 January 2016 Crosa was absorbed by the neighbouring municipality of Lessona.

As an autonomous comune Crosa bordered the following municipalities: Casapinta, Cossato, Lessona, Strona.

Demographic evolution

References

Former municipalities of the Province of Biella
Frazioni of the Province of Biella
Cities and towns in Piedmont